Kenneth Leroy Charlery (born 28 November 1964), is a former St Lucian international footballer, who has played club football in England with Birmingham City and for Basildon United, Watford, Peterborough United, Boston United and Barnet, among others.

Playing career
Charlery obtained legendary status in his first spell at Peterborough United by scoring two goals in the 1992 3rd Division Play Off Final including an 89th-minute winner. Ken left Posh in the 1992–93 season to sign for Watford but returned the following year for a second spell at the club but was unable to save them from relegation to the old Second Division. He was named as captain by new Posh manager, John Still for the 1994–95 season; he was voted player of the year, the second time he'd received the accolade. He moved to Birmingham in 1995 but was back for a third spell with Posh in 1996. In the 1996–97 season he endured a run of 24 scoreless games, which saw him depart for the final time. He is still known affectionately as King Kenny at London Road.

Coaching career
He was working as Assistant Manager at Harrow Borough, before joining Peterborough United as an assistant coach to help Andy Legg and Barry Fry with coaching responsibilities until the end of the 2005–06 season.

Charlery returned to Harrow Borough, where as assistant manager, he helped them gain a place in the play-offs of the Isthmian League Premier Division in 2010–11. In the summer of 2011 he moved to St Albans City to be assistant manager under David Howell.

In November 2015, Charlery was appointed manager of Ware. After being dismissed in January 2017 despite the club being in a respectable mid table position he became the owner of London Colney as well as being becoming first team manager. He resigned as manager in March 2021.

Honours

As a player 
Peterborough United
 Football League Third Division play-offs: 1992
Stockport County
 Football League Second Division second-place promotion: 1996–97
Boston United
 Football Conference: 2001–02

As an individual 
 Peterborough United Player of the Year (2): 1991–92, 1994–95
 Peterborough United Hall of Fame

References

External links

Profile at UpThePosh! The Peterborough United Database
Profile on Harrow Borough F.C. website
http://world.theposh.com/javaImages/49/ec/0,,10427~3206217,00.jpg Charlery handed Posh coaching job

1964 births
Living people
Saint Lucian footballers
Saint Lucia international footballers
Basildon United F.C. players
Billericay Town F.C. players
Fisher Athletic F.C. players
Maidstone United F.C. (1897) players
Peterborough United F.C. players
Watford F.C. players
Birmingham City F.C. players
Southend United F.C. players
Stockport County F.C. players
Barnet F.C. players
Boston United F.C. players
Dagenham & Redbridge F.C. players
Farnborough F.C. players
Waltham Forest F.C. players
Harrow Borough F.C. players
Association football forwards
English football managers
Ware F.C. managers
London Colney F.C. managers
England semi-pro international footballers